The Cawnpore Bank (1845) was a bank founded in the year 1845 in British India. The bank became defunct in the year 1852 with the winding down of its operations. The bank was notable for being the thirty first oldest bank in India.

History

Founding  

The Cawnpore Bank was founded in 1845 in Kanpur, India.

The bank was well known for providing stiff competition to the then Bank of Bengal, which is a precursor of today's State Bank of India.

Management 

The bank was staffed by mostly British nationals who were drawn mainly from the East India Company.

The bank was headquartered in the Kanpur city in the United Provinces.

Final years 

In 1851, the bank was on the verge of failure.

The bank was finally closed in the year 1852.

Legacy 

The bank is notable for being the thirty first oldest bank in India.

The bank played a key role in the history of Banking in India.

See also

Indian banking
List of banks in India

References

External links
 History of the bank by the Reserve Bank of India
 History of the Bank
 History of the Bank

Defunct banks of India
Companies based in Kanpur
Banks established in 1845